The Wetar scops owl (Otus tempestatis) is an owl endemic to Wetar of the Maluku Islands of Indonesia. It was previously considered a subspecies of the Moluccan scops owl (O. magicus), but was split as a distinct species by the IUCN Red List and BirdLife International in 2014, and the International Ornithological Congress followed suit in 2022.

References

Wetar scops owl
Birds of Wetar
Wetar scops owl